The American Invitational Mathematics Examination (AIME) is a selective and prestigious 15-question 3-hour test given since 1983 to those who rank in the top 5% on the AMC 12 high school mathematics examination (formerly known as the AHSME), and starting in 2010, those who rank in the top 2.5% on the AMC 10. Two different versions of the test are administered, the AIME I and AIME II. However, qualifying students can only take one of these two competitions.

The AIME is the second of two tests used to determine qualification for the United States Mathematical Olympiad (USAMO), the first being the AMC.

The use of calculators is not allowed on the test, with only pencils, erasers, rulers, and compasses permitted.

Format and scoring

The competition consists of 15 questions of increasing difficulty, where each answer is an integer between 0 and 999 inclusive. Thus the competition effectively removes the element of chance afforded by a multiple-choice test while preserving the ease of automated grading; answers are entered onto an OMR sheet, similar to the way grid-in math questions are answered on the SAT. Leading zeros must be gridded in; for example, answers of 7 and 43 must be written and gridded in as 007 and 043, respectively.

Concepts typically covered in the competition include topics in elementary algebra, geometry, trigonometry, as well as number theory, probability, and combinatorics. Many of these concepts are not directly covered in typical high school mathematics courses; thus, participants often turn to supplementary resources to prepare for the competition.

One point is earned for each correct answer, and no points are deducted for incorrect answers. No partial credit is given.  Thus AIME scores are integers from 0 to 15 inclusive.

Some historical results are:

A student's score on the AIME is used in combination with their score on the AMC to determine eligibility for the USAMO. A student's score on the AMC is added to 10 times their score on the AIME. In 2006, the cutoff for eligibility in the USAMO was 217 combined points.

During the 1990s it was not uncommon for fewer than 2,000 students to qualify for the AIME, although 1994 was a notable exception where 99 students achieved perfect scores on the AHSME and the list of high scorers, which usually was distributed in small pamphlets, had to be distributed several months late in thick newspaper bundles.

History

The AIME began in 1983. It was given once per year on a Tuesday or Thursday in late March or early April. Beginning in 2000, the AIME is given twice per year, the second date being an "alternate" test given to accommodate those students who are unable to sit for the first test because of spring break, illness, or any other reason. However, under no circumstances may a student officially participate both competitions. The alternate competition, commonly called the "AIME2" or "AIME-II," is usually given exactly two weeks after the first test, on a Tuesday in early April. However, like the AMC, the AIME recently has been given on a Tuesday in early March, and on the Wednesday 15 days later, e.g. March 13 and 20, 2019. In 2020, the rapid spread of the COVID-19 pandemic led to the cancellation of the AIME II for that year. Instead, qualifying students were able to take the American Online Invitational Mathematics Examination, which contained the problems that were originally going to be on the AIME II. 2021's AIME I and II were also moved online.

Sample problems

Given that

Answer: 839

Find the number of ordered pairs of integers  such that the sequence

is strictly increasing and no set of four (not necessarily consecutive) terms forms an arithmetic progression. (2022 AIME I #6)
Answer: 228

Find . (1989 AIME #7)
Answer: 925

Find . (2012 AIME I #14)
Answer: 375

Note

See also
 American Mathematics Competitions
 List of mathematics competitions
 Mandelbrot Competition

References

External links 
 The Official AMC Home Page
 Complete Archive of AIME Problems and Solutions

Mathematics competitions
Recurring events established in 1983